Thank You, My Twilight is an album released by The Pillows on October 23, 2002. The song "Biscuit Hammer" contains a reference to The Great Dictator, Charlie Chaplin's first film to employ spoken dialog.  The titular song is featured in several episodes of FLCL Progressive and FLCL Alternative.

Track listing
 "Rain Brain"
 "Biscuit Hammer" (ビスケットハンマー BISUKETTO HANMA)
 "Poem of Babylon Angel" (バビロン 天使の詩 BABIRON Tenshi no Uta)
 "My Beautiful Sun (Irene)"
 "Come on, Ghost"
 "Robotman"
 "Ritalin 202"
 
 "Winona" (ウィノナ WINONA)
 "Thank You, My Twilight"
 "Rookie Jet"

2002 albums
The Pillows albums